Sullavan is a surname. Notable people with the surname include:

 Margaret Sullavan (1909–1960), American actress, wife of Henry Fonda, William Wyler, and Leland Hayward

See also
 Sullivan (disambiguation)